This is a list of former African-American child actors. These actors were aged 17 or less at the time they started acting but are currently 18 or over. The list also includes deceased child actors.

Movies and/or TV series they appeared in are mentioned only if they were still a child at the time of filming.

See also 
 List of African-American actors

 
 
 
 
 
African-American